Mogra Phulaalaa is an Indian Marathi language family-drama film, directed by Shrabani Deodhar, and produced by  Arjun Singgh Baran and Kartik Nishandar.
The film starring Swwapnil Joshi, Sai Deodhar, Neena Kulkarni and Chandrakant Kulkarni follows a story of possessive mother and her devoted son, and how the things change when he meets woman of his dreams. The film was released on 14 June 2019.

Cast

 Swwapnil Joshi as Sunil Kulkarni
 Sai Deodhar 
 Neena Kulkarni as mother of Sunil
 Chandrakant Kulkarni
 Sandeep Pathak
 Samidha Guru as Sister-in-law
 Sonamm Nishandarm
 Anand Inghale
 Vighnesh Joshi
 Sanyogitha Bhave
 Dipti Bhagwat
 Saanvi Ratnalikar
 Prasad Limaye as younger brother
 Ashish Ghokale
 Aditya Deshmukh as Pankaj
 Prachi Joshi
 Harsha Gupte
 Anuradha Rajadhyaksha
 Umesh Dhamle
 Madhuri Bharti
 Siddhirupa Karmarkar
 Suhita Thatte

Release
The official trailer of the film was launched on 3 June 2019 by Zee Music Company.

The film was released on 14 June 2019.

Critical response
The Times of India gave the film three stars out of five, and praised the performances of Swwapnil Joshi, Sai Deodhar, Neena Kulkarni and felt that, the way the characters of the film gave life to the narrative was appreciable. Concluding, they wrote "Mogra Phulaalaa makes for a decent watch because it sensibly portrays the family equations in families today. Watch it for the same.
Chitrali Chogle of the Times Now
gave the film two and half stars out of five, and concurred with TOI in praising the performances of entire cast. Summing up Chogle noted, "Mogra Phulaalaa is a good film with all the masala, drama and story, but has some missing points and some loopholes. Nevertheless, the film is entertaining enough to be seen and enjoyed with family."

Soundtrack

The soundtrack is composed by Rohit Shyam Raut and lyrics are by Abhishek Khankar.

References

External links
 

2010s Marathi-language films
2019 films
Indian drama films
Indian family films